Canto Secondo is an experimental music album by the band Il Sogno del Marinaio. It is the band's second album. The album has been described as "Captain Beefheart meets The Grateful Dead meets freeform jazz" and an "effortless balance between Watt’s formidable past and his still potent future."

The album was recorded over eight days.

Track listing

Track list and songwriting credits

 "Animal from Tango" (Andrea Belfi)
 "Alain" (Andrea Belfi)
 "Nanos' Waltz" (Mike Watt)
 "Skinny Cat" (Stefano Pilia)
 "Mountain Top" (Stefano Pilia)
 "Il Sogno del Fienile" (Mike Watt)
 "Auslander" (Andrea Belfi)
 "Stucazz?!!" (Mike Watt)
 "Sailor Blues" (Stefano Pilia)
 "Us in Their Land" (Pilia / Watt)

References

External links
Canto Secondo at Mike Watt's Hoot Page

Mike Watt albums
2014 albums